Bromopropylate is a chemical compound used as an acaricide against spider mites in apiaries and on fruit crops such as citrus and grapes. It was banned by the European Union in 2011.

Preparation
Bromopropylate is prepared by the esterification of the 4,4'-dibromo derivative of benzilic acid with isopropanol.

References

Acaricides
Bromoarenes
Carboxylate esters
Tertiary alcohols
Isopropyl esters